Thomas Hart Benton (April 15, 1889 – January 19, 1975) was an American painter, muralist, and printmaker. Along with Grant Wood and John Steuart Curry, he was at the forefront of the Regionalist art movement. The fluid, sculpted figures in his paintings showed everyday people in scenes of life in the United States.

His work is strongly associated with the Midwestern United States, the region in which he was born and which he called home for most of his life. He also studied in Paris, lived in New York City for more than 20 years and painted scores of works there, summered for 50 years on Martha's Vineyard off the New England coast, and also painted scenes of the American South and West.

Early life and education
Benton was born in Neosho, Missouri, into an influential family of politicians. He had two younger sisters, Mary and Mildred, and a younger brother, Nathaniel. His mother was Elizabeth Wise Benton and his father, Colonel Maecenas Benton, was a lawyer and four times elected as U.S. congressman. Known as the "little giant of the Ozarks", Maecenas named his son after his own great-uncle, Thomas Hart Benton, one of the first two United States Senators elected from Missouri. Given his father's political career, Benton spent his childhood shuttling between Washington, D.C., and Missouri. His father sent him to Western Military Academy in 1905–06, hoping to shape him for a political career. Growing up in two different cultures, Benton rebelled against his father's plans. He wanted to develop his interest in art, which his mother supported. As a teenager, he worked as a cartoonist for the Joplin American newspaper, in Joplin, Missouri.

With his mother's encouragement, in 1907 Benton enrolled at The School of The Art Institute of Chicago. Two years later, he moved to Paris in 1909 to continue his art education at the Académie Julian. His mother supported him financially and emotionally to work at art until he married in his early 30s. His sister Mildred said, "My mother was a great power in his growing up." In Paris, Benton met other North American artists, such as the Mexican Diego Rivera and Stanton Macdonald-Wright, an advocate of Synchromism. Influenced by the latter, Benton subsequently adopted a Synchromist style.

Early career and World War I

After studying in Europe, Benton moved to New York City in 1912 and resumed painting. During World War I, he served in the U.S. Navy and was stationed at Norfolk, Virginia. His war-related work had an enduring effect on his style. He was directed to make drawings and illustrations of shipyard work and life, and this requirement for realistic documentation strongly affected his later style. Later in the war, classified as a "camoufleur", Benton drew the camouflaged ships that entered Norfolk harbor. His work was required for several reasons: to ensure that U.S. ship painters were correctly applying the camouflage schemes, to aid in identifying U.S. ships that might later be lost, and to have records of the ship camouflage of other Allied navies. Benton later said that his work for the Navy "was the most important thing, so far, I had ever done for myself as an artist."

Marriage and family
At the age of 33, Benton married Rita Piacenza, an Italian immigrant, in 1922. They met while Benton was teaching art classes for a neighborhood organization in New York City, where she was one of his students. They were married for almost 53 years until Benton's death in 1975; Rita died eleven weeks after her husband. The couple had a son, Thomas Piacenza Benton (1926-2010), and a daughter, Jessie Benton, (1939-2023), who became a major figure in the Fort Hill Community founded by Mel Lyman; Benton himself was identified as a "benefactor" to the community, giving them "dozens of paintings".

Later career

Dedication to Regionalism

On his return to New York in the early 1920s, Benton declared himself an "enemy of modernism"; he began the naturalistic and representational work today known as Regionalism. He toured America, making sketches and ink wash drawings of the things he saw. He would go back to these sketches again and again as reference for future paintings. He expanded the scale of his Regionalist works, culminating in his America Today murals at the New School for Social Research in 1930–31. In 1984, the murals were purchased and restored by AXA Equitable to hang in the lobby of the AXA Equitable Tower at 1290 Sixth Avenue in New York City. In December 2012 AXA donated the murals to the Metropolitan Museum of Art. The Met's exhibition "Thomas Hart Benton's 'America Today' Mural Rediscovered" ran until April 19, 2015. The murals were described as showing how Benton absorbed and used the influence of the Greek artist El Greco.

Benton broke through to the mainstream in 1932. A relative unknown, he won a commission to paint the murals of Indiana life planned by the state in the 1933 Century of Progress Exhibition in Chicago. The Indiana Murals stirred controversy; Benton painted everyday people, and included a portrayal of events in the state's history which some people did not want publicized. Critics attacked his work for showing Ku Klux Klan (KKK) members in full regalia. The KKK reached its peak membership in 1925. In Indiana, 30% of adult males were estimated to be members of the Klan, and in 1924 KKK members were elected as governor, and to other political offices.

These mural panels are now displayed at Indiana University in Bloomington, with the majority hung in the "Hall of Murals" at the Auditorium. Four additional panels are displayed in the former University Theatre (now the Indiana Cinema) connected to the Auditorium. Two panels, including the one with images of the KKK, are located in a lecture classroom at Woodburn Hall.

In 1932, Benton also painted The Arts of Life in America, a set of large murals for an early site of the Whitney Museum of American Art. Major panels include Arts of the City, Arts of the West, Arts of the South and Indian Arts. In 1953 five of the panels were purchased by the New Britain Museum of American Art in Connecticut, and have since been displayed there.

On December 24, 1934, Benton was featured on one of the earliest color covers of Time magazine. Benton's work was featured along with that of fellow Midwesterners Grant Wood and John Steuart Curry in an article entitled "The U.S. Scene". The trio were featured as the new heroes of American art, and Regionalism was described as a significant art movement.

In 1935, after he had "alienated both the left-leaning community of artists with his disregard for politics and the larger New York-Paris art world with what was considered his folksy style", Benton left the artistic debates of New York for his native Missouri. He was commissioned to create a mural for the Missouri State Capitol in Jefferson City. A Social History of Missouri is perhaps Benton's greatest work. In an interview in 1973, he said, "If I have any right to make judgments, I would say that the Missouri mural was my best work". As with his earlier work, controversy arose over his portrayal of the state's history, as he included the subjects of slavery in the history of Missouri, the Missouri outlaw Jesse James, and the political boss Tom Pendergast. With his return to Missouri, Benton embraced the Regionalist art movement.

He settled in Kansas City and accepted a teaching job at the Kansas City Art Institute. This base afforded Benton greater access to rural America, which was changing rapidly. Because of his Populist political upbringing, Benton's sympathy was with the working class and the small farmer, unable to gain material advantage despite the Industrial Revolution. His works often show the melancholy, desperation and beauty of small-town life. In the late 1930s he created some of his best-known work, including the allegorical nude Persephone. It was considered scandalous by the Kansas City Art Institute, and was borrowed by the showman Billy Rose, who hung it in his New York nightclub, the Diamond Horseshoe. It is now held by the Nelson-Atkins Museum of Art in Kansas City. Karal Ann Marling, an art historian, says it is "one of the great works of American pornography."

In 1937, Benton published his autobiography An Artist in America, which was critically acclaimed. The writer Sinclair Lewis said of it: "Here’s a rare thing, a painter who can write." During this period Benton also began to produce signed, limited-edition lithographs, which were sold at $5.00 each through the Associated American Artists Galleries based in New York.

Teaching career
Benton's autobiography indicates that his son was enrolled from age 3 to 9 at the City and Country School in New York in exchange for his teaching art there. He included the school's founder, Caroline Pratt, in "City Activities with Dance Hall", one of the ten panels in America Today.

Benton taught at the Art Students League of New York from 1926 to 1935 and at the Kansas City Art Institute from 1935 to 1941. His most famous student, Jackson Pollock, whom he mentored in the Art Students League, founded the Abstract Expressionist movement.  Pollock often said that Benton's traditional teachings gave him something to rebel against. With another of his students, Glen Rounds, who went on to become a prolific author and illustrator of children's books, Benton spent a summer touring the Western United States in the early 1930s. In the 1930s Benton taught at the Ste. Genevieve Art Colony in Ste. Genevieve, Missouri.

Benton's students in New York and Kansas City included many painters who contributed significantly to American art. They included Pollock's brother Charles Pollock, Eric Bransby, Charles Banks Wilson, Frederic James, Lamar Dodd, Reginald Marsh, Charles Green Shaw, Margot Peet, Jackson Lee Nesbitt, Roger Medearis, James Duard Marshall, Glenn Gant, Fuller Potter, William Fredrick Kautzman, and Delmer J. Yoakum. Benton also briefly taught Dennis Hopper at the Kansas City Art Institute; Hopper was later known for being an independent actor, filmmaker, and photographer.

Later life
During World War II, Benton created a series titled The Year of Peril, which portrayed the threat to American ideals by fascism and Nazism. The prints were widely distributed. Following the war, Regionalism fell from favor, eclipsed by the rise of Abstract Expressionism. Benton remained active for another 30 years, but his work included less contemporary social commentary and portrayed pre-industrial farmlands.

Benton was hired in 1940, along with eight other prominent American artists, to document dramatic scenes and characters during the production of the film The Long Voyage Home, a cinematic adaptation of Eugene O'Neill's plays. Benton was also an accomplished harmonica musician, recording an album for Decca Records in 1942 titled Saturday Night at Tom Benton's.

He continued to paint murals, including Lincoln (1953), for Lincoln University in Jefferson City, Missouri; Trading At Westport Landing (1956), for The River Club in Kansas City; Father Hennepin at Niagara Falls (1961) for the Power Authority of the State of New York; Joplin at the Turn of the Century (1972) in Joplin; and Independence and the Opening of the West, for the Harry S. Truman Library in Independence. His commission for the Truman Library mural led to his developing a friendship with Harry S. Truman that lasted until the former U.S. President's death.

Benton died in 1975 at work in his studio, as he completed his final mural, The Sources of Country Music, for the Country Music Hall of Fame in Nashville, Tennessee.

Legacy and honors
Benton was elected into the National Academy of Design in 1954 as an Associate member and became a full member in 1956. In 1961, Benton was chosen as one of 50 outstanding Americans of meritorious performance in the fields of endeavor, to be honored as a Guest of Honor to the first annual Banquet of the Golden Plate in Monterey, California. Honor was awarded by vote of the National Panel of Distinguished Americans of the Academy of Achievement.

In 1977, Benton's 2 story late-Victorian residence and carriage house studio in Kansas City was designated by Missouri as the Thomas Hart Benton Home and Studio State Historic Site. The historic site has been preserved nearly unchanged from the time of his death; clothing, furniture, and paint brushes are still in place. Displaying 13 original works of his art, the house museum is open for guided tours. Benton was the subject of the eponymous 1988 documentary, Thomas Hart Benton, directed by Ken Burns and produced by WGBH-TV.

In December 2019, a lawsuit was filed by Benton's daughter, Jessie, her son, and her two daughters against the UMB Bank, a trustee of the Benton Trusts and manager of Benton's estate since 1979: "More than a hundred paintings gone, priceless works of art stored in subpar conditions, paintings sold for fire sale prices - those are the allegations put forward by a new lawsuit filed by the heirs of famous American artist Thomas Hart Benton." The bank did not directly respond to the specific allegations in the lawsuit but characterized them as misguided. The bank's president, Jim Rine, said that it regrets that the Bentons chose to resolve the issue through litigation and that the bank takes its role as trustee of Benton's art very seriously.

Writings
.
.
(Illustrated by Thomas Hart Benton) Europe After 8:15 – H.L. Mencken—1914
(Illustrated by Thomas Hart Benton) Schoolhouse in the Foothills – Ella Enslow—1937
(Illustrated by Thomas Hart Benton) Tom Sawyer – Mark Twain—1939
(Illustrated by Thomas Hart Benton) Grapes of Wrath – John Steinbeck—1940
(Illustrated by Thomas Hart Benton) Huckleberry Finn – Mark Twain—1941
(Illustrated by Thomas Hart Benton) Taps for Private Tussie – Jesse Stuart—1943
(Illustrated by Thomas Hart Benton) Benjamin Franklin’s Autobiography & Other Tales —1944
(Illustrated by Thomas Hart Benton) Life on the Mississippi – Mark Twain—1944
(Illustrated by Thomas Hart Benton) The Oregon Trail – Francis Parkman—1945
(Illustrated by Thomas Hart Benton) Ozark Folksongs (4 Vols.) – Vance Randolph (endpapers only) – 1946-50
(Illustrated by Thomas Hart Benton) We the People – Leo Huberman—1947
(Illustrated by Thomas Hart Benton) Green Grow the Lilacs – Lynn Riggs—1954
(Illustrated by Thomas Hart Benton) Three Rivers South (Young Abe Lincoln) – Virginia Eifert – 1955

References

Notes

Catalogs and monographs

Major museum exhibitions 
 "Thomas Hart Benton's 'America Today' Mural Rediscovered", organized by the Metropolitan Museum of Art
 "American Epics: Thomas Hart Benton and Hollywood", organized by the Peabody Essex Museum, the Nelson-Atkins Museum of Art, and the Amon Carter Museum of American Art

Further reading
 Adams, Henry, "Thomas Hart Benton's Fall from Grace", Missouri Historical Review, 109 (April 2015), 145–57. Heavily illustrated.

Wien, Jake Milgram, "The Gold Dust Twins: Thomas Hart Benton, Walt Disney, and the Mining of Frontier Mythology". The Magazine Antiques, May/June 2015

External links

The Official Website for Thomas Hart Benton
Works by Thomas Hart Benton in the Smithsonian American Art Museum
Thomas Hart Benton papers, 1906-1975 from the Smithsonian Archives of American Art

 Works by Thomas Hart Benton at the State Historical Society of Missouri
 The Long Voyage Home Artist Portraits and Paintings at The Ned Scott Archive
 
 
 

1889 births
1975 deaths
20th-century American painters
20th-century American printmakers
Académie Julian alumni
American expatriates in France
American male painters
American muralists
Art Students League of New York faculty
Artists from Kansas City, Missouri
Camoufleurs
Kansas City Art Institute alumni
Military personnel from Missouri
Modern painters
Painters from Missouri
People from Neosho, Missouri
People of the New Deal arts projects
School of the Art Institute of Chicago alumni
United States Navy personnel of World War I
United States Navy sailors
Writers from Missouri
20th-century American male artists
Members of the American Academy of Arts and Letters